Jan Petránek (28 December 1931, Prague – 10 November 2018, Prague) was a Czech journalist, commentator and dissident during communist era of Czechoslovakia. He was a signatory of Charter 77.

Biography
Petránek was a journalist for Czech Radio, the public radio broadcaster, at the time of the Prague Spring and the Warsaw Pact invasion of Czechoslovakia in 1968. He was fired by Czech Radio's management shortly after the invasion, but resumed underground, independent broadcasts during the country's Normalization period.

In the late 1980s, Petránek also became involved with the samizdat publication of the Lidové noviny newspaper, which had been banned by the Communist government since the 1950s.

Petránek became the editor of the Lidové noviny once the newspaper was legalized following the Velvet Revolution. He was also rehired by Czech Radio after the fall of communism in 1989.

In 2015, President of the Czech Republic Miloš Zeman awarded Petránek the Medal of Merit.

Petránek died in Prague on 10 November 2018, at the age of 86.

References

1931 births
2018 deaths
Charter 77 signatories
Recipients of Medal of Merit (Czech Republic)
Czech journalists
Czechoslovak journalists
Czechoslovak writers
Czechoslovak dissidents
Journalists from Prague